Doc Potts or Doc Potts and Weselly is an animated television series employing the Syncro-Vox technique proposed by Clark Haas and Cambria Studios. Dick Brown and Edwin Gillette prepared a pilot episode in 1960, but the series was never produced.

Haas described Doc Potts as a "lovable old veterinarian, a sort of combination Charley Weaver and Charlie Ruggles," and Weselly as "an eager Boy Ranger, a young innocent who finds all the answers in his Boy Ranger official manual and who contrasts sharply with (Clutch Cargo'''s) Spinner's relative worldliness."

References
 "Don't believe your eyes! How 'Clutch Cargo' cuts corners as a television comic strip." TV Guide'' December 24, 1960, p. 28-29.

External links
 Doc Potts at Big Cartoon DataBase

1960s American animated television series
American children's animated television series
Television series by Cambria Productions
Unproduced television shows